Douaumont-Vaux is a commune in the Meuse department in Grand Est in north-eastern France. It was established on 1 January 2019 by merger of the former communes of Vaux-devant-Damloup (the seat) and Douaumont.

See also
 Communes of the Meuse department

References

Communes of Meuse (department)